The Christian Historical Party (in Dutch: Christelijk Historische Partij, CHP) was a Dutch conservative Reformed political party, which existed from 1903 to 1908. The CHP is historically linked to the Christian Democratic Appeal which is currently one of the major parties of the Netherlands.

Party history
The CHP was founded in April 1903 as a merger of two conservative Protestant parties, the Free Anti Revolutionary Party and the Christian Historical Voters' League.  Both were turned again the leadership and ideology of Abraham Kuyper, the leader of the main Protestant Anti Revolutionary Party.  Kuyper had initiated a new political course for Protestantism in the Netherlands, which included cooperation with the Catholics, in the coalition, strategical support for extension of suffrage a rejection of theocracy in favour of a specific conception of state neutrality, sphere sovereignty and a strong party organization and party discipline.  The opposition against Kuyper was led by Alexander de Savorin Lohman, who founded the Free Anti Revolutionary Party.

In 1908, the CHP merged with the Frisian League, another conservative Protestant party, to form the Christian Historical Union

Name
The term "Christian Historical" was used before 1897 to denote supporters of the main Protestant party, the Anti Revolutionary Party, emphasizing the Protestant nature of the history of the Netherlands.

Ideology & Issues
The CHP was a conservative Protestant party. It saw government as a god-given institution, which should act according to biblical norms. Society should furthermore follow its historical course.  Power should not be based on the opinion of the majority but on authority.

The CHP was formed as a result of dissent within the main Protestant party the Anti Revolutionary Party, unlike that party the CHP did not recognize Catholicism as a legitimate religion.  The party was strong anti-papist. According to the CHP, the Netherlands was a Protestant nation. As such it was hostile to the Catholic segment of society. It renounced the coalition between the Protestant Anti Revolutionary Party and the catholic General League and antithesis between religious and areligious parties. Catholic influences within society should be limited.

The CHP advocated limited government.  It supported only limited government interference in the economy and instead advocated charity to help the poor. Furthermore, the party opposed general suffrage.

Representation
This table shows the CHP's results in elections to the House of Representatives and Senate, as well as the party's political leadership: the fractievoorzitter.  It also possible that the party leader is a member of the cabinet; if D66 was part of the governing coalition, the "highest ranking" minister is listed.

Electorate
The electorate of the CHP was mainly constituted by adherents of the Dutch Reformed Church from the upper class, especially nobility, land owners, high officers and high-ranking civil servants.  It won and kept seats in several districts with large reformed populations, Goes in Zeeland, Apeldoorn in Gelderland, Dokkum in Friesland, and Katwijk and Schiedam in South Holland.

International comparison
As a party for Protestant dissenters of a catholic-Protestant alliance, the CHP is a unique phenomenon in international perspective.  Its political course, which included support of limited government, rejection of universal suffrage and hostility against Catholicism, is comparable to the course of the British Conservative Party in the late 1800s and to some extent American Party of the United States.

References

Protestant political parties
Defunct political parties in the Netherlands
Confessional parties in the Netherlands
Political parties established in 1903
Defunct Christian political parties
Political parties disestablished in 1908
1903 establishments in the Netherlands
1908 disestablishments in the Netherlands